The Federação de Futebol do Distrito Federal (English: Football Association of Federal District) was founded on March 16, 1959, and it manages all the official football tournaments within the state of Distrito Federal, which are the Campeonato Brasiliense and the Campeonato Brasiliense lower levels, and represents the clubs at the Brazilian Football Confederation (CBF).

References

Distrito Federal
Sports organizations established in 1959